The NCAA Division I Men's Tennis Championship is an annual men's college tennis national collegiate championship sponsored by the National Collegiate Athletic Association (NCAA) for teams in Division I.  The tournament crowns a team, individual, and doubles champion . The first intercollegiate championship was held in 1883, 23 years before the founding of the NCAA, with Harvard's Joseph Clark taking the singles title. The same year Clark partnered to Howard Taylor to win the doubles title. The first NCAA-sponsored tournament was held in 1946.

In 1963, the NCAA began to organize separate tournaments for Division I and Division II. A tournament for Division III was also added in 1973.  However, after 1995, the NCAA no longer holds a Division II tournament. The national championship rounds are contested annually in May. In recent years, the NCAA Division I Women's Tennis Championship has been held at the same location as the men's tournament.

Pre-NCAA Championships

Singles and Doubles Championships  (1883–1945)

NCAA Championships

Singles, Doubles, and Team–Points Championships (1946–1976)

Singles, Doubles, and Team–Bracket Championships (1977–present)

The NCAA was founded in 1906, but the first NCAA-sponsored championship would not be held until 1946.
Before 1977, individual wins counted in the team's total points. In 1977, a dual-match, single-elimination team championship was initiated, eliminating the points system.

Team titles

Result by school and by year 

191 teams have appeared in the NCAA tournament in at least one year starting with 1977, when the tournament shifted to its current bracket format. The results for all years are shown in this table below.

The code in each cell represents how far the team made it in the respective tournament:
  National Champion
  National Runner-up
  Semifinals
  Quarterfinals
  Round of 16
  Round of 32 (1999–present)
  Regional Finals (1996–1998)
  First round (1987–1993)
  Round of 64 (1999–present)
  Regional semifinals (1996–1998)
  Regional Quarterfinals (1996–1998)

See also
NCAA Men's Tennis Championships (Division II, Division III)
NAIA Men's Tennis Championship
NCAA Women's Tennis Championships (Division I, Division II, Division III)

References

External links
 List of NCAA champions

Tennis Men
NCAA Division I tennis championships
Tennis tournaments in the United States
College tennis in the United States
College men's tennis in the United States
Tennis